Akaki Bakradze (29 March 1928 – 6 December 1999) was a Georgian writer, literary critic, art historian, and public figure, who published widely on diverse issues. Among other prominent posts, Bakradze was director of the Rustaveli Theatre from 1973–1980, and in 1988 was appointed artistic director of the Marjanishvili Theatre.

Bakradze published in-depth studies on Ilia Chavchavadze, Akaki Tsereteli, Grigol Robakidze and on other major Georgian writers, and on social and literary issues. In the early 1990s, he led the Rustaveli Society, which was one of the political forces opposing Zviad Gamsakhurdia. In this role, he advocated for independence, pluralism, the private ownership of land, and independent parties.

Bibliography 
 To the School, Intelekti Publishing, 2013 
 For Abkhazia, Tbilisi, 2002,
 Last Night of Nino Chavchavadze, Tbilisi, 2000
 Mythological Engadi, Nekeri Publishing, 2000
 Kardu or Life and Merit of Grigol Robakidze, Lomisi Publishing, 1999
 Issue of Osetians, Pitagora Publishing, 1996
 Thirteen Years in Cinema- in the World of Masks, Farnavazi Publishing, 1996 
 Discarded Road, Sarangi Publishing, 1995 
 Faith, Merani Publishing, 1990 
 Taming Literature, Sarangi Publishing, 1990, Ebooks Literasi Publishing, 2011
 Thought and Judgment, Sov. Georgia, 1972

References 

1928 births
1999 deaths
20th-century writers from Georgia (country)
20th-century historians from Georgia (country)
Literary critics from Georgia (country)
Male writers from Georgia (country)